Cratomastotermes is an extinct genus of termites in the family Cratomastotermitidae, the sole genus of the family. There is one described species in Cratomastotermes, C. wolfschwenningeri.

References

Termites
Taxa named by Michael S. Engel